The Pensions Act 2014 is a piece of United Kingdom legislation, that received Royal Assent on 14 May 2014. This Act of Parliament is published by HMSO. It establishes a new state pension scheme for people who attain state pension age on or after the 6 April 2016.

References

Pensions in the United Kingdom
United Kingdom Acts of Parliament 2014